Reginald Francis Coyle (1 August 1917 – 26 April 1998) was an Australian rules footballer who played for South Melbourne in the Victorian Football League (VFL) in the 1930s and 1940s.

Family
The son of Reginald Charles Coyle (1889–1940), and Ellen Cecilia Coyle (1885–1963), née Sullivan, Reginald Francis Coyle was born at South Melbourne, Victoria on 1 August 1917.

He married Annie Veronica Cawley (1918–1989) in 1940. They had six children.

Football

South Melbourne (VFL)
Coyle was recruited from the local club South Melbourne City (he had won the competition's beat and fairest award in 1936), and made his VFL debut for South Melbourne against Carlton at the Lake Oval in Round 12 1937.

A wingman, Coyle had played 53 senior games by the end of the 1941 season, and polled votes in the 1940 and 1941 Brownlow Medal counts.

Second AIF
He enlisted in the Second AIF in 1942, and continued to play football with Army teams during his service. In Queensland, in late June/early July, he was the vice-captain, and one of the team's best players, of a combined Army team (captain Charlie Van Der Bist) that beat a combined RAAF team (captain Allan La Fontaine) 17.14 (116) to 14.11 (95).

South Melbourne (VFL)
On his discharge from the army (in 1945), he played a further nine games in the 1945 season.

Port Melbourne (VFA)
He was cleared from South Melbourne to Port Melbourne in April 1946.

Military service
He enlisted in the Second AIF on 18 July 1942, and had gained the rank of Corporal by the time of his discharge on 28 March 1945.

Death
He died at Heidelberg, Victoria on 26 April 1998.

Notes

References
 World War Two Nominal Roll: Corporal Reginald Francis Coyle (VX88343), Department of Veterans' Affairs.
 A13860, VX88343: World War Two Service Record: Corporal Reginald Francis Coyle (VX88343), National Archives of Australia.
 B883, VX88343: World War Two Service Record: Corporal Reginald Francis Coyle (VX88343), National Archives of Australia.

External links
 
 
 Reg Coyle, at The VFA Project

1917 births
1998 deaths
Australian rules footballers from Melbourne
Sydney Swans players
Port Melbourne Football Club players
Australian Army personnel of World War II
Australian Army soldiers
People from South Melbourne
Military personnel from Melbourne